Lucas Frost Giolito (born July 14, 1994) is an American professional baseball pitcher for the Chicago White Sox of Major League Baseball (MLB).

He attended Harvard-Westlake School in Studio City, California, and was selected by the Washington Nationals in the first round in the 2012 MLB draft. He made his MLB debut with the Nationals in 2016.

In 2019, as a member of the White Sox, he was named to the MLB All-Star Game and pitched one scoreless inning in a 4–3 victory for the American League.

On August 25, 2020, he became the 19th player in White Sox history to throw a no-hitter in a 4–0 victory over the Pittsburgh Pirates. Giolito struck out 13 batters with just one walk to become the first White Sox player to toss a no-hitter with 10 or more strikeouts.

Early life 
Giolito was born at Providence Saint Joseph Medical Center in Burbank, California, on July 14, 1994. He grew up in Santa Monica, California. Giolito began playing Tee-ball at the age of 5, and he played Little League Baseball at Santa Monica Little League. He threw his very first  pitch at the age of 14.

Amateur career
Giolito attended Harvard-Westlake School in Studio City, Los Angeles, California. He was part of a Harvard-Westlake baseball team that included Max Fried and Jack Flaherty, with Ethan Katz as their pitching coach. In March 2012, his senior year, Giolito sprained the ulnar collateral ligament in his right elbow, sidelining him for the rest of his high school season. Giolito had committed to attend the University of California, Los Angeles (UCLA) and play for the UCLA Bruins baseball team.
Although some thought he was good enough to be selected with the first overall choice of the 2012 MLB draft, concerns about his elbow caused him to fall to the 16th overall selection, where he was picked by the Washington Nationals.

Professional career

Minor leagues

Giolito signed with the Nationals on July 13, 2012—thirty seconds before the deadline—to a minor league contract with a $2.925 million signing bonus. By the end of the month, the team had scheduled Tommy John surgery to repair his injured elbow ligament.

By the following summer, he made eight starts for the Gulf Coast Nationals of the rookie-level Gulf Coast League in 2013 and posted a 2.78 earned run average (ERA). He was promoted to the Auburn Doubledays of the Class A-Short Season New York–Penn League, and allowed one earned run in the 16 innings he pitched. In 2014, Giolito played his first full season of professional baseball with the Hagerstown Suns of the Class A South Atlantic League. He went 10–2 with a 2.20 ERA and 110 strikeouts compared to 28 walks over 20 starts. He was selected as the 2014 South Atlantic League Most Valuable Pitcher and Top Minor League Prospect. He also appeared in the All-Star Futures Game.

Giolito began the 2015 season with the Potomac Nationals of the Class A-Advanced Carolina League, and received a midseason promotion to the Harrisburg Senators of the Class AA Eastern League. The Nationals assigned Giolito to Harrisburg to start the 2016 season. He received a promotion to the Syracuse Chiefs of the Class AAA International League in July.

Major leagues

Washington Nationals

On June 28, 2016, the Nationals added Giolito to their active roster and he made his major league debut that night against the New York Mets. In his debut, he pitched four shutout innings, allowing one hit and two walks, while getting one strikeout.

Chicago White Sox
On December 7, 2016, the Nationals traded Giolito, Reynaldo López, and Dane Dunning to the Chicago White Sox for Adam Eaton. Giolito began the 2017 season with the Charlotte Knights of the International League. On August 27, 2017, Giolito earned his first MLB victory in a 7–1 White Sox win over the Detroit Tigers. Giolito threw seven scoreless innings yielding only three hits and striking out four Tigers. Giolito finished the season going 3–3 with a 2.38 ERA in 7 starts.

The following season, in 2018, he was part of the starting rotation, making 32 starts for the White Sox, going 10–13 with a 6.13 ERA. In  innings, he struck out 125 but led the American League in walks (90) and earned runs (118), and was 3rd in the league in hit by pitch (15), 4th in wild pitches (13), and 9th in home runs allowed (27). In 2018 he had the highest rate of bases on balls per 9 innings pitched in the majors (4.67), and had the highest WHIP among major league pitchers (1.48). He also had the worst left on base percentage of all qualifying major league pitchers, stranding only 63.5% of base runners.

In 2019, Giolito's third season and second in the White Sox starting rotation, he greatly improved from the previous year as he went on a nine-game winning streak after starting the year with a 10–1 record. He pitched his first career shutout on May 23 against the Houston Astros. He was also rewarded AL pitcher of the month for the month of May. On June 30, 2019, Giolito was named as one of the American League pitchers for the 2019 MLB All-Star Game, his first All-Star selection. On September 16, 2019, the White Sox shut down Giolito for the rest of the season due to a mild lat strain in his pitching arm. Giolito finished the season with a 14–9 record, a 3.41 ERA, 228 strikeouts and three complete games over  innings in 29 starts. He also finished 6th in the AL Cy Young Award voting.

On August 25, 2020, Giolito no-hit the Pittsburgh Pirates 4–0 at Guaranteed Rate Field. He struck out 13 batters and threw 74 of 101 pitches for strikes; a fourth-inning walk to Erik González was the only blemish in an otherwise perfect game. The no-hitter was the 19th in White Sox history, the most recent having been Philip Humber's perfect game on April 21, 2012, and the most recent by a White Sox pitcher at Guaranteed Rate Field having been Mark Buehrle's perfect game on July 23, 2009. That season, Giolito went 4–3 in 12 starts with an ERA of 3.48, and struck out 97 in  innings as the White Sox made the playoffs that season. Giolito made his postseason debut against the Oakland Athletics in game 1 of the Wild Card Series. He pitched 7 innings giving up 2 hits, 1 walk, 1 run, and struck out 8. He even retired the first 18 batters he faced in that game. He picked up the win as the White Sox beat the Athletics with a final score of 4–1 but the White Sox went on to lose the Series to the Athletics.

In 2021, Giolito made 31 starts with a record of 11-9 and an ERA of 3.53. He pitched in 178.2 innings and struck out 201 batters. He had the lowest ground ball percentage of all major league pitchers, at 33.2%.

In 2022, Giolito had an 11–9 record in 30 starts pitching to an ERA of 4.90 in 161.2 innings giving up 171 hits and 92 runs while he struck out 177 batters.

On January 13, 2023, Giolito signed a one-year, $10.4 million contract with the White Sox, avoiding salary arbitration.

Personal life
Giolito is the son of actress Lindsay Frost and video game producer Rick Giolito. His one grandfather, Warren Frost, was an actor. His other grandfather, Silvio Giolito, was a two time Olympic Fencer and multiple time US National Champion.  His brother Casey is also an actor. His uncle, Mark Frost, is a novelist, television screenwriter, and producer. He is best known as the co-creator of Twin Peaks with David Lynch. His other uncle, Scott Frost, is also a writer. In December 2018, Giolito married his high school sweetheart, Ariana Dubelko-Giolito.

References

External links

1994 births
Living people
Baseball players from Los Angeles
Major League Baseball pitchers
American League All-Stars
Washington Nationals players
Chicago White Sox players
Gulf Coast Nationals players
Auburn Doubledays players
Hagerstown Suns players
Potomac Nationals players
Harrisburg Senators players
Syracuse Chiefs players
Charlotte Knights players
Frost family
Harvard-Westlake School alumni
Twitch (service) streamers